Alberto Lucchese (Treviso, 28 March 1986) is a retired Italian rugby union player and his usual position was Scrum-Half.

In the 2014–15 and 2015–16 Pro12 seasons, he played for Benetton Treviso.

In 2016 Lucchese was named in the Italy squad for the 2016 Six Nations and he represented it on 2 occasions.

References

External links 
It's Rugby English Profile
ESPN Profile
Ultimate Rugby Profile

Sportspeople from Treviso
Italian rugby union players
1986 births
Living people
Italy international rugby union players
Rugby union scrum-halves
Benetton Rugby players
Venezia Mestre Rugby FC players
Mogliano Rugby players